The 1987 Men's ICI Perspex World Team Squash Championships were held in London, England and took place from October 17 until October 31, 1987. A record twenty-seven countries entered.

Seeds

Results

Qualifying Pool 1

Qualifying Pool 2

Qualifying Play Offs

Pool A

Pool B

Pool C

Pool D

Quarter-finals

Semi-finals

Third Place Play Off

Final

See also 
World Team Squash Championships
World Squash Federation
World Open (squash)

References 

World Squash Championships
Squash tournaments in the United Kingdom
International sports competitions in London
Squash
Mens
Squash competitions in London